San Basile is a town and comune in the province of Cosenza in the Calabria region of southern Italy.

Both Italian and Arbëresh are spoken in the town.

References

Arbëresh settlements
Cities and towns in Calabria